Fast Getaway II is a 1994 direct-to-video action comedy/adventure film, starring Corey Haim, Cynthia Rothrock and Leo Rossi. The film is a sequel to the popular Fast Getaway, released in 1991.

Plot
Nelson Potter, now retired from bank robbing, runs an insurance business in Tucson, Arizona with his partner Patrice. Their job is to evaluate security measures at local banks by staging armed robberies. After one such drill, Nelson is confronted and assaulted by a shady FBI agent named Rankin.

Later that night, Lilly (a vengeful ex-partner from Nelson's bank robbing days) arrives at the same bank. Faking a flat tire, she tricks the two janitors into opening the door and incapacitates them before sending two of her own men to carry out the robbery.

The next morning, Nelson receives a call notifying him of the breach. However, Patrice gets fed up with his immaturity and womanizing and quits the business. Nelson learns that no money was taken from the bank, but instead the thieves were after the contents of a safe deposit box. Nelson brings surveillance photos from the break-in to his father Sam in prison, who quickly identifies Lilly as the culprit.

Meanwhile, Agent Rankin confronts Patrice at Nelson's house. He alleges that Nelson is nothing more than a common criminal, who only escaped justice because his father made a deal with the District Attorney. He also reveals that three of the five banks she and Nelson evaluated for security had been robbed afterwards, and suspects Nelson is responsible. He then manhandles Patrice and threatens her with prosecution if she is involved.

Lilly stages a medical emergency at another bank in order to steal a key to the front door. That night, a drunken Nelson returns home from a date to find a burglar lurking within. He chases the man outside, only to be knocked out by Lilly. She then enters the bank with her cohorts and gains access to the vault, where she plants a pocketknife taken from Nelson's home to incriminate him.

Nelson calls Patrice over to his house and the two make amends. While watching his own security footage, Nelson witnesses the encounter between her and Agent Rankin, just before Ranken arrives to arrest him. Nelson flees with Rankin in pursuit, but he eventually manages to get away.

At the prison, Sam watches a news broadcast implicating Nelson in the robberies. With the help of Lilly's old partner Tony, Sam escapes the prison and sneaks into Nelson's house, where he runs into Patrice. The two leave together, unaware that Ranken is tailing them. They reunite with Nelson at a laundromat, where Sam reveals Lilly's scheme to replace old money to be taken out of circulation with counterfeit bills. When Ranken arrives, Sam and Nelson barely avoid being captured; Patrice surrenders herself in their stead. With the help of a colleague, she tracks Nelson to the bank where Lilly is predicted to strike next.

Lilly takes Nelson, Sam, and Patrice captive while she robs the bank, but an exploding bundle of money triggers the fire alarm causing everyone to flee. Lilly takes Patrice hostage while Sam and Nelson give chase. When a psychotic Rankin shows up with a grenade launcher, Sam distracts him long enough for Nelson to catch up with Lilly and rescue Patrice.

Early the next day, Sam returns to prison just in time for the morning roll call, having smuggled in a bag of money from the previous night's robbery. Outside, Nelson and Patrice share a kiss and discuss renewing their partnership before driving away together.

Cast
 Corey Haim as Nelson Potter
 Leo Rossi as Sam Potter
 Sarah G. Buxton as Patrice
 Cynthia Rothrock as Lilly
 Ken Lerner as Tony Bush
 Anthony T. Pennello as Bruno
 Nicholas Mele as Alejandro Mira
 Peter Liapis as FBI Agent Rankin
 David Alexander Johnston as Dr. Paul Hertz
 Tiffany Grant as Nelson's Date
 Maggie Grant as Bank Teller
 Tina Naughton as Newscaster
 Kenny Jacobs as Bank Vice President
 Wally Bujack as Bank President

Production notes
The film was shot in Tucson, Arizona and features a 1994 Mazda RX7 as his getaway car.

Release history
Fast Getaway II was released on VHS by Live Entertainment and in Canada by C/FP Video in 1994.

References

 Fast Getaway II combined details IMDB.com. Retrieved December 28, 2005.
 Fast Getaway II Filming location notes  IMDB.com. Retrieved December 28, 2005.

External links
 

1994 direct-to-video films
1994 action comedy films
1990s teen comedy films
American action comedy films
American direct-to-video films
Direct-to-video sequel films
American independent films
American sequel films
American teen comedy films
CineTel Films films
Films shot in Tucson, Arizona
Films set in Tucson, Arizona
1990s adventure films
American action adventure films
Artisan Entertainment films
1994 comedy films
1994 films
1990s English-language films
1990s American films